Suello is a comune (municipality) in the Province of Lecco in the Italian region Lombardy, located about  northeast of Milan and about  southwest of Lecco. Lago di Annone is located on its borders.

Suello borders the following municipalities: Annone di Brianza, Cesana Brianza, Civate.

Demographic evolution

References

Cities and towns in Lombardy